Dean Bowring is an English silver medalist powerlifter. In 2009, he won the Indian IPF World Championships at the super-heavyweight category after he lifted a total of 880 kg (1940 lbs) at the GBPF South Midlands in Southampton. He has been outspoken against the use of performance-enhancing drugs in powerlifting.

See also
 List of world championships medalists in powerlifting (men)
 Powerlifting at the World Games

References

External links 

Year of birth missing (living people)
British powerlifters
Living people